Adam Rapoport (born 1969) is an American former magazine editor. After serving as a Style Editor at GQ, Rapoport was the editor-in-chief of Bon Appétit magazine from 2010 until his resignation in 2020.

Early life and education 
Rapoport was born in Washington, D.C., to Maxine and Dan Rapoport. His mother was born a Polish Catholic and later converted to Judaism. His father was a journalist, author, and publisher who founded a small publishing company. Rapoport was raised Jewish. He attended Woodrow Wilson High School, graduating in 1987, and then attended the University of California, Berkeley, graduating in 1992.

Career 
In 1994, Rapoport joined the James Beard Foundation as an assistant in the foundation's publication office. In 1997, he joined the New York division of Time Out magazine as a restaurant editor. In 2000, Rapoport became the Style Editor of GQ magazine.

Rapoport succeeded Barbara Fairchild as the editor-in-chief of Bon Appétit magazine in 2010.

In 2017, Rapoport hosted the first season of Food Network's Best Baker in America.

In June 2020, Rapoport drew criticism after a photo resurfaced of him in racial brownface on Halloween 2004. Originally posted by his wife on Instagram in 2013, the photo was also framed on his desk. He was wearing a t-shirt, a do-rag, silver chains, and a baseball cap. His leadership was simultaneously brought into question after food editor Sohla El-Waylly accused the magazine of discriminating against employees of color. That day, Rapoport announced he would step down.

References

1969 births
Living people
American editors
20th-century American Jews
Bon Appétit people
People from Washington, D.C.
University of California, Berkeley alumni
Woodrow Wilson High School (Washington, D.C.) alumni
21st-century American Jews